Variations sur le même t'aime is the second album by popular French singer Vanessa Paradis. It was released in France in 1990, and contains the hit singles "Tandem" and "Dis-lui toi que je t'aime".

Background and writing

For this album, she reunited with the team of writers and producers of her first album. She also collaborated with Serge Gainsbourg, who helped write and produce the album. Although the album was successful and charted higher than her debut, none of its singles matched the success of "Joe le Taxi" from her first album.

Consistently termed her most cohesive work, Gainsbourg's lyrics frequently contain innuendo or double entendre, including the album's title. The highest charting and biggest selling single from the album was "Tandem". 

"Variations sur le même t'aime" literally means "Variations on the same 'love you'" with the double meaning of "Variations on the same theme",  - the title was coined by Serge Gainsbourg as well, an allusion to his hit song with Jane Birkin, "Je t'aime". The album is notable as being the last record Gainsbourg worked on for a female singer before his death in 1991.

Keeping in tradition with all of Vanessa Paradis' albums, Variations sur le même t'aime features one English language track, a cover of Lou Reed's "Walk on the Wild Side". The single "Dis-lui toi que je t'aime" remains the most performed song (live) from this album. Despite being released in 1990, the album has consistently remained in print and sells a sizable number of copies each year, primarily in Paradis' native France, as well as in French-speaking Canada.

Track listing
 "L'Amour à deux"  4:55 
 "Dis-lui toi que je t'aime"  3:58 
 "L'Amour en soi"  5:07 
 "La Vague à lames"  3:15 
 "Ophélie"  4:01 
 "Flagrant délire"  3:45 
 "Tandem"  3:30 
 "Au charme non plus"  3:50 
 "Variations sur le même t'aime"  3:59 
 "Amour jamais"  4:17 
 "Ardoise"  4:00 
 "Walk on the Wild Side" (Lou Reed)  4:28

All songs written by Serge Gainsbourg (lyrics) and Franck Langolff (music), except where noted.

Personnel 

Marina Albert - backing vocals
Antonietti, Pascault et Ass. - design
Patrick Bourgoin - saxophone on "Au charme non plus" and "Walk on the Wild Side"
Ann Calvert - backing vocals
Bertrand Châtenet - arranger, engineer & mixing
Philippe Cusset - additional engineer
Jus D'Orange - backing vocals
Alex Firla - assistant engineer
Carole Fredericks - backing vocals

Cyril Labesse - engineer on "L'amour en soi"
Franck Langolff - arranger, guitar
Jean-Jacques Milteau - harmonica on "L'amour en soi"
Philippe Osman - arranger, backing vocals, bass programming, drum programming, guitar, keyboards & synthesizer
François Ovide - guitar on "Walk on the Wild Side"
Didier Pain - artistic coordinator
Paul Personne - guitar on "L'amour à deux"
Gérard Prévost - bass guitar & double bass on "Walk on the Wild Side"
Frédérique Veysset - photography

Mixed at Studio Guillaume Tell

Charts

Certifications

References

1990 albums
Vanessa Paradis albums
Polydor Records albums